Philip McGuigan (born 1973) is an Irish Sinn Féin politician who has been a Member of the Northern Ireland Assembly (MLA) for  North Antrim since 2016, having previously served from 2003 to 2007.  
He is a former member of Ballymoney Borough Council.

He was raised in Swatragh, County Londonderry.

McGuigan was elected to the Assembly in 2003 representing North Antrim. He was elected to the Ballymoney Council in 2001, aged 27, with the highest vote of any of the sixteen elected council and then elected to the Causeway Coast and Glens Council in 2013. McGuigan was elected in the Assembly elections for North Antrim in 2003 but stood aside before Daithí McKay contested the election on behalf of Sinn Féin in 2007. He was an unsuccessful candidate at the 2005 general election to the House of Commons also for North Antrim. He returned to the Assembly in 2016, replacing McKay following the latter's resignation. In the 2017 Assembly election, McGuigan became the first Sinn Féin candidate to top the poll in the North Antrim constituency.

He and his wife Paula have four children, Rachael, Stephen, Cathair and Daithi. They live in Dunloy.

References

1973 births
Living people
People from County Londonderry
Sinn Féin MLAs
Northern Ireland MLAs 2003–2007
Northern Ireland MLAs 2016–2017
Northern Ireland MLAs 2017–2022
Sinn Féin councillors in Northern Ireland
Members of Ballymoney Borough Council
Sinn Féin parliamentary candidates
Northern Ireland MLAs 2022–2027